Dongsheng is a town in north-central Zhongshan, Guangdong province, People's Republic of China. , it has 8 residential communities and 6 villages under its administration.

See also 
 List of township-level divisions of Guangdong

References 

Towns in Guangdong
Zhongshan